Stein Åros (17 March 1952 – 4 July 1996) was a Norwegian politician for the Labour Party.

He served as a deputy representative to the Parliament of Norway from Rogaland during the terms 1981–85, 1985–89 and 1989–93. In total he met during 12 days of parliamentary session.

References

1952 births
1996 deaths
Deputy members of the Storting
Labour Party (Norway) politicians
Rogaland politicians